Formula Student is a student engineering competition held annually all over the world. Student teams from around the world design, build, test, and race a small-scale formula style racing car. The cars are judged on a number of criteria as listed below. It is run by the Institution of Mechanical Engineers and uses the same rules as the original Formula SAE with supplementary regulations.

Ambassadors of Formula Student include David Brabham, Paddy Lowe, Willem Toet, Leena Gade, Dallas Campbell, Mike Gascoyne, and James Allison.

Formula Student partnered with Racing Pride in 2019 to support greater inclusivity across the British motorsport industry for LGBT+ fans, employees and drivers.

Class definitions
There are two entry classes in Formula Student, designed to allow progressive learning.

Formula Student Class (formerly Class 1)
This is the main event, where teams compete with the cars they have designed and built. Teams are judged across 6 categories and must pass a rigorous inspection by judges before being allowed to compete for the dynamic events. There are usually 100-120 teams in this class.

Concept Class (formerly Class 2)
This is a concept class for teams who only have a project and plan for a Class 1 car. It can include any parts or work that has been completed in the project so far but this is not necessary. Teams are judged on business presentation, cost and design. Schools can enter both FS Class and Concept Class cars, allowing Concept Class to be used for inexperienced students to practise their development in advance of a full Formula Student Class entry.

Class 1A (pre-2012)

This was an alternative fueled class with the emphasis placed upon the environmental impact of racing. A car from the previous year's Class 1 entry could be re-entered and re-engineered allowing the students to concentrate on the low carbon aspect of the competition without having to redesign a new chassis and ancillaries. Cars in Class 1A were judged in the same events alongside Class 1 however the cost category was replaced by one for sustainability and the endurance event had a greater emphasis placed upon measured emissions. Class 1A cars were scored and ranked independently of Class 1. Since 2012, both Petroleum and Alternative fueled cars have competed for places in the same rankings.

Class 2A (pre-2012)
This was a concept class for teams who only had a project and plan for a Class 1A car. It could include any physical parts or work that had been completed for the project so far, but was not essential. Teams were judged on business presentation, cost and design. Schools could enter both Class 1A and Class 2A teams, with Class 2A allowing inexperienced students to gain competition experience in preparation for a full Class 1A entry.

Judging
The cars are judged by industry specialists on the following criteria:

Static events
Engineering design (150 points)
 Cost & Manufacturing  (115 points)
 Business presentation (115 points)
 Lap Time Simulation (20 points)
Technical inspection (comprising 6 tests): safety, chassis, noise, tilt, brake, and tech (no points)

Dynamic events
Skidpad (figure of 8) (75 points)
1 km autocross/sprint (100 points)
75 m acceleration (75 points)
22 km endurance (250 points) and fuel economy (100 points)

The winner of the event is the team with the highest number of points out of a maximum of 1000.

Venues
The first event was held at the Motor Industry Research Association (MIRA) proving ground in 1998. Following that, the event was held for three years at the NEC Birmingham between 1999 and 2001. The event was then held on the Go-Kart track at Bruntingthorpe Aerodrome between 2002 and 2006, before moving to Silverstone Circuit in 2007 where the competition remains until this day. The dynamic events have taken place on Luffield and Brooklands corners in the past but 2012 saw Copse corner and the National Circuit pit straight being used.

Winners

Most wins

Support
 Patron: Ross Brawn (former team principal of Mercedes Formula One team),
 Ambassador: The Lord Drayson, Baron Drayson (Former Minister of Science)

Notable judges
 Carroll Smith
 Jon Hilton - Flybrid systems, ex Renault F1
 Andrew Deakin - Renault F1
 Chief Judge - Richard Folkson, ex Ford
 Neil Anderson
 Alex Snook - Aptiv
 Willem Toet - Sauber F1
 Alex Hickson - GKN Aerospace Filton UK
 Dan Jones - Flybrid Systems
 Allan Staniforth
 David Gould - Gould Racing
 Pat Clarke
 Nick Vaughan
 Matt Wilkin - Brawn GP
 Ben Michell - Dunlop Tyres
 Claude Rouelle - Optimum G

See also
 Formula SAE
 Formula SAE Australasia
 IIT Bombay Racing
 University of Patras Formula Student Team - UoP Racing Team
 ETSEIB Motorsport
 DJS Racing

References

External links 
Sheffield Formula Racing
Cardiff Racing
Formula Student
Ain Shams University Racing team
Oxford Brookes Racing
PWR Racing Team
Southampton Formula Student Team
Swansea University Race Engineering
IIT Bombay Racing
Orbit Racing - F1 in Schools
Team Bath Racing
Team Kratos Racing Electric
UH Racing
University of Birmingham Racing
University of Portsmouth's Formula Student Team
UCD Formula Student
Formula Student FEUP

Automotive engineering
Engineering education in the United Kingdom
Formula SAE
Institution of Mechanical Engineers
Motorsport in the United Kingdom
Student competitions
Motorsport
Formula racing